Rhymesayers Entertainment (sometimes abbreviated RSE) is an American independent hip-hop record label based in Minneapolis.

History 
Rhymesayers Entertainment was co-founded in 1995 by Sean Daley (Slug), Anthony Davis (Ant), Musab Saad (Sab the Artist) and Brent Sayers (Siddiq). Former members of the Headshots crew. Beginning in 2008, Rhymesayers Entertainment sponsors the annual Soundset Music Festival, a popular attraction that takes place over Memorial Day weekend in Minneapolis. The music festival was postponed in 2020.

Rhymesayers released Prof and Dem Atlas from their label in 2020. 

In 2020, Rhymesayers was among the many labels distributed by Alternative Distribution Alliance that left the company after ADA moved all of its business to the Indiana-based Direct Shot Distributing. Controversy erupted when Direct Shot received numerous complaints from retailers over delayed or missing shipments. As a result, Secretly Distribution became the current distributor for Rhymesayers Entertainment.

The label also opened a record store in 1999 called Fifth Element, which closed on April 1, 2020.

Roster

Artists in promotion by 2016

 Aesop Rock
 Atmosphere (Slug and Ant)
 Brother Ali
 Dilated Peoples (DJ Babu, Evidence and Rakaa)
 Evidence
 Eyedea & Abilities
 Face Candy (Eyedea, Kristoff Krane, J.T. Bates and Casey O'Brien) 
 Felt (Murs and Slug)
 Hail Mary Mallon (Aesop Rock, DJ Big Wiz and Rob Sonic)
 I Self Devine
 Malibu Ken (Tobacco and Aesop Rock)
 Micranots (I Self Devine and DJ Kool Akiem)
 MInk (Musab and Ink Well)
 Nikki Jean
 Sa-Roc
 Semi.Official (I Self Devine and DJ Abilities)
 Soul Position (Blueprint and RJD2)
 Step Brothers (The Alchemist and Evidence)
 The Uncluded (Aesop Rock and Kimya Dawson)

Archived artists

 Abstract Rude
 Blueprint
 Budo
 DJ Abilities
 Freeway
 Grayskul (JFK aka Ninjaface and Onry Ozzborn)
 Jake One
 MF Doom
 Mr. Dibbs
 P.O.S
 Psalm One
 Sab the Artist
 Toki Wright

Artists formerly signed to the label include

 Boom Bap Project
 The Dynospectrum
 Mac Lethal
 Prof
 Grieves
 Dem Atlas

See also
 List of record labels
 Twin Cities hip hop
 Underground hip hop

References

Further reading

External links
 
 

 
Record labels established in 1995
American independent record labels
Independent record labels based in Minnesota
Hip hop record labels
Hip hop collectives
Companies based in Minneapolis
Minnesota culture